Eri Hozumi and Makoto Ninomiya were the defending champions, but both players chose to participate with different partners. 

Akiko Omae and Peangtarn Plipuech won the title, defeating Luksika Kumkhum and Yuuki Tanaka in the final, 3–6, 6–0, [11–9].

Seeds

Draw

References 
 Draw

Dunlop World Challenge - Doubles
Dunlop World Challenge
2015 Dunlop World Challenge